The Fiat 626 was an Italian medium truck that met specifications for the Italian army and air force for military operations prior to World War II. The Fiat 626 NLM operated in Italian North Africa (1940–1943), Italian East Africa (1940–1941), the Balkans (1940–1944), France (1940–1944), and Soviet Union (1941-1943/44).

In 1939, the 626 was the first FIAT truck with forward control and it replaced the  models 621 and 633.
 
The initial version of the 626 for civilian use was the 626N ("N" for Nafta, the Italian for diesel). This was followed by a slightly longer wheelbase version the 626NL (from Nafta Lungo - "diesel long").
The military version for the Italian Army and the Italian Air Force was the 626NLM (for Nafta Lungo Militare)

A reliable workhorse, the FIAT 626 became the standard Italian medium truck and operated on all fronts.

France ordered 1,650 trucks; 700 had been delivered by the time Italy declared war on June 10, 1940. After the Italian armistice with the Allies in September 1943, the FIAT 626 was used by German forces. By 31 January 1945 3,000 had been produced for German use. In 1941, 100 trucks were purchased by the Bulgarian army after Bulgaria became an ally of Germany and Italy. The Bulgarian Army still used the vehicles in 1944–1945, after the country signed an armistice with the Allies' and participated in the war against Germany.

Production finished in 1948, after 10,000 Fiat 626 had been produced at FIAT's Turin assembly lines.

References 
 

626
World War II vehicles of Italy
Military trucks of Italy
Military vehicles introduced in the 1930s
Vehicles introduced in 1939